Vukašin Dević (Serbian Cyrillic: Вукашин Девић; born 15 March 1984) is a Serbian former professional footballer who played as a defender.

External links
 
 
 
 

Association football defenders
C.F. Os Belenenses players
Expatriate footballers in Portugal
FK Radnički Pirot players
FK Srem Jakovo players
Footballers from Belgrade
Primeira Liga players
Red Star Belgrade footballers
S.C. Beira-Mar players
Liga Portugal 2 players
Serbian expatriate footballers
Serbian expatriate sportspeople in Portugal
Serbian First League players
Serbian footballers
Serbian SuperLiga players
1984 births
Living people